Chicxulub Pueblo Municipality (In the Yucatec Maya Language: "horn lit place" or "flea devil") is one of the 106 municipalities in the Mexican state of Yucatán containing  (196.72 km2) of land and located roughly 25 km north of the city of Mérida. The area was considered the epicenter of the Chicxulub crater.

History
In ancient times, the area was part of the chieftainship of Ceh-Pech until the conquest. At colonization, Chicxulub Pueblo became part of the encomienda system with Julián Doncel recorded as the encomendero in 1549.

In 1821, Yucatán was declared independent of the Spanish Crown. In 1905, Chicxulub belonged to the region headquartered in Izamal. In the second half of the nineteenth century, Chicxulub Pueblo was joined to the municipality of Tixkokob, but 1918,  Chicxulub became head of its own municipality.

Governance
The municipal president is elected for a term of three years. The president appoints Councilpersons to serve on the board for three year terms, as the Secretary of Public Works, Councilperson of maintenance and sanitation, Councilperson of nomenclature and the Councilperson of Ecology, Parks and Public Gardens.

The Municipal Council administers the business of the municipality. It is responsible for budgeting and expenditures and producing all required reports for all branches of the municipal administration. Annually it determines educational standards for schools.

The Police Commissioners ensure public order and safety. They are tasked with enforcing regulations, distributing materials and administering rulings of general compliance issued by the council.

Communities
The head of the municipality is Chicxulub Pueblo, Yucatán. There are 8 other population centers, including Cofradia, Guadalupe, Lactún, Pedregal, San José Chacán, Santa María Ontiveros,  Uaymitún Puerto and Xiutumuc. The major population areas are shown below:

Local festivals
Every year on 2 February the feast of the Virgin of Candelaria is celebrated and on 3 May, a festival of the Holy Cross occurs. From 1 to 9 October the Procession of Christ of the Blisters is observed.

Tourist attractions
 Archaeological site Chakán 
 Archaeological site Lactún
 Church of  Santiago
 Hacienda Lactún
 Hacienda San José Kuché
 Hacienda Santa María Ontiveros

References

Municipalities of Yucatán